NGC 287 is a lenticular galaxy in the constellation Pisces. It was discovered on November 22, 1827 by John Herschel.

References

External links
 

0287
18271122
Pisces (constellation)
Lenticular galaxies
Discoveries by John Herschel
003145